The USA Marathon Championships is the annual national championships for marathon running in the United States. The race serves as a way of designating the American national champion for the marathon. The men's race was first contested in 1925 and a women's race was added to the program in 1974.

Since 1968, in years which the Summer Olympics are held the event serves as a way of selecting the athletes who will represent the United States at the Olympic Games, with the top three eligible finishers selected to be on the Olympic team and the fourth and fifth eligible finishers being designated as alternates. During these years, the race is more commonly referred to as the U.S. Olympic Marathon Trials and it is much more competitive.

Men's results

Multiple winners

Women's results

Multiple winners

Records

See also
USA Half Marathon Championships
USA Cross Country Championships
USA Indoor Track and Field Championships
USA Outdoor Track and Field Championships

References

General
USA Champions Men's Marathon. USATF. Retrieved on 2014-07-08
USA Champions Women's Marathon. USATF. Retrieved on 2014-07-08
2012 US Olympic trials Marathon History Media Guide. Retrieved on 2014-07-08

External links
USA Track and Field website

Marathon
Recurring sporting events established in 1925

Marathon
Marathon
USA Marathon Championships